John Faber the Younger (1684 – 2 May 1756) was a Dutch portrait engraver active in London.

Life
 
Faber was born in The Hague, the son of the artist John Faber the Elder, and learned mezzotint and drawing from his father after the family's move to London. He then enrolled at the St Martin's Lane Academy.

In later life Faber resided at the Golden Head in Bloomsbury Square, London, where he died of gout on 2 May 1756. From the inscription on a masonic portrait of Frederick, Prince of Wales, it appears that Faber was a Freemason himself.  According to Horace Walpole, his widow, of whom there is an engraving by Faber from a portrait by Thomas Hudson, remarried a lawyer of the name of Smith.

Works
Faber concentrated on mezzotints and was prolific. He was commissioned by Sir Godfrey Kneller and Peter Lely to reproduce their works (the 48-image Kit-Kat Club for the former).

Among his early works were portraits of Charles I of England (1717), Charles XII of Sweden (1718), Sir George Byng (1718), Eustace Budgell (1720), and others. Faber presents the transitional period from Kneller to that of Joshua Reynolds and Thomas Gainsborough. More than 400 of his portraits survive.

His works include a whole-length of Jane Collier, and one of Father Couplet (from a picture by Kneller at Windsor); also the portraits of Charles II in his robes of state (after Lely), Ignatius Loyola (after Titian), Don Jose Carreras (after Kneller), and the six aldermen known as "Benn's Club" (after Hudson). He published sets of engravings, among the best known being The Beauties of Hampton Court, The Five Philosophers of England, and The Members of the Kit-Cat Club: the Kit-Cat Club at one time held its meetings in Fountain Court, The Strand, London, where Faber also lived. Faber was engaged on the engravings from 1731 to 1735, and in the latter year they were published by him and Jacob Tonson.

Faber occasionally produced other types of subject, such as The Taking of Namur (after Jan Wyck), St Peter (after Anthony van Dyck), Salvator Mundi (after Robert Browne), and domestic subjects after Philip Mercier.

References

External links
John Faber Junior at the National Portrait Gallery

Attribution

1684 births
1756 deaths
Dutch engravers
Portrait engravers
Artists from The Hague